Monster Energy Yamaha Factory is the factory team of Yamaha active in the MotoGP World Championship, the Motocross World Championship and Rally Dakar, supported by sponsor, drinks manufacturer Monster Energy.

MotoGP

In the MotoGP World Championship the Monster Energy Yamaha Factory team takes the official name of Monster Energy Yamaha MotoGP Team. The Monster Energy brand is sponsor of the official team starting from the 2019 season.

Riders
2023
 Fabio Quartararo
 Franco Morbidelli
2022
 Fabio Quartararo
 Franco Morbidelli
2021
 Fabio Quartararo
 Franco Morbidelli
 Maverick Viñales

2020
 Maverick Vinales
 Garrett Gerloff
 Valentino Rossi

2019
 Maverick Vinales
 Valentino Rossi

Results
(key)

Rally raid

The so-called "Dakar team" is made up of the following three official drivers.
Adrien Van Beveren
Andrew Short
Ross Branch

See also
 Yamaha Motor Racing
 Monster Energy

Notes

References

External links

Motorcycle racing teams
Motorsport in Japan